Hot Lead is a 1951 Western film. It stars Tim Holt and Joan Dixon and is directed by Stuart Gilmore.

The production uses footage from an earlier Holt film, Saddle Legion, one of the rare times this happened in Holt's movies.

It was the last film made featuring Lightning, Holt's Palomino horse in 27 movies. He was replaced by Sun Dance, another Palomino.

Plot

Cast
 Tim Holt as Tim Holt
 Joan Dixon as Gail Martin
 Richard Martin as Chito Rafferty
 Ross Elliott as Dave Collins
 John Dehner as Turk Thorne
 Robert J. Wilke as Stoney

Reception
According to film critic Tom Stempel:
Hot Lead was one Holt written by William Lively. Unlike Houston and Repp, he had no feel for the Tim-Chito relationship. At the end of the film they ride off arguing, something Tim and Chito never did. The film was directed by Stuart Gilmore, one of only six features he directed. He soon realized he was a better editor than director and had a long career as a film editor.

References

External list
 
 
 
 

1951 films
American Western (genre) films
1951 Western (genre) films
RKO Pictures films
American black-and-white films
1950s English-language films
1950s American films